Sportsmark is Sport England's accreditation scheme for secondary schools. The scheme recognises a school's out of hours sports provision.

Sportsmark awards are given to secondary schools for provision for sport and physical education. They are currently being reviewed along with Activemark awards with plans for a new sports partnership mark. When the policies were introduced there was little other investment into school sport. In England, if a school or college is given sportsmark accreditation, it is then entered for specialist status.

References

See also
 Sport in England
Artsmark
Charter Mark

Education in England
Quality
School sport in the United Kingdom
Youth sport in England